Chartbusters Go Pop (subtitled 20 Legendary Covers from 1969/70 as sung by Elton John) is a compilation album of cover versions by Elton John.

These recordings are from the days prior to Elton John's success as a solo performer. They are taken from a variety of periodically issued budget-priced compilations of hit songs, under brand names including Top of the Pops, Chartbusters and Hot Hits.  These were issued by budget labels including Music for Pleasure and featured current or recent hits re-recorded, with varying degrees of note-for-note accuracy, by nameless 'soundalike' performers.  Like many other jobbing session singers of the time, John worked as a vocalist on these albums.

These covers compilations were cheaply recorded, cheaply priced, and sold in large quantities until, in 1972, compilations featuring the original artists were introduced by such labels as K-Tel.  The public preferred the original recordings and the market for cheap cover compilations rapidly declined.  This album collects together John's contributions to a variety of covers albums issued during 1969 and 1970. This collection was released by minor labels in the UK and US in 1994 and was re-issued many times afterwards.

Track listing

References 

1994 compilation albums
Covers albums
Elton John compilation albums